Sven Kums (born 26 February 1988) is a Belgian footballer who plays as a midfielder for Gent.

Club career

Early career
Born in Asse, Kums began his career at Dilbeek Sport, before joining Anderlecht in 1996.

Anderlecht
He played in the youth and reserve teams for 10 years, and in 2006 he became part of the first team. In the first half of the 2006–07 season he did not feature in a single first team game. He was hoping to finally get a chance to play for Anderlecht's first team, but ended up playing for the second team every week.

Lierse (loan)
In January 2007, Kums moved to Lierse S.K. on loan. He made his debut in professional football on 10 February 2007 against FC Brussels. Kums played 14 games during his loan spell, scoring one goal. Lierse were relegated, and Kums returned to Anderlecht.

Kortrijk (loan)
In January 2008 he joined Second Division team K.V. Kortrijk on loan. There, Kums played 16 games, scoring 5 goals, helping KVK win the title and secure promotion to the Belgian Pro League.

Kortrijk
In June 2008, Kortrijk signed him to a permanent deal.

Heerenveen
In March 2011, sc Heerenveen announced that Kums would join their team for the 2011–12 season, the transfer fee was rumoured to be around €500.000. He played his first match in the Eredivisie on 6 August 2011 against NEC.

After two relatively successful seasons with Heerenveen, Kums returned to Belgium, signing a three-season deal with SV Zulte Waregem.

Zulte Waregem
He signed for Zulte Waregem in 2013. In one season for Essevee, he played 41 games, scoring 5 goals. The team finished 4th, and Kums' performances didn't go unnoticed.

Gent
On 1 July 2014, KAA Gent announced that Kums would join their squad that summer, signing a four-year contract. Kums had a successful season, and for the first time in club history, Ghent became Belgian champions.

Watford / Udinese
On 29 August 2016, Kums was sold to Watford but immediately sent on a season-long loan deal to Udinese.

Return to Anderlecht
On 2 June 2017, it was announced that Anderlecht acquired Kums from Watford. In his debut against Bayern Munich away in the UEFA Champions League, he was sent off after just 11 minutes.

Gent (loan)
On 21 August 2019, he rejoined Gent on loan.

International career
On 5 September 2008, Kums made his debut for the Belgium national under-21 football team against Slovakia.

On 2 October 2015, Belgium national football team coach Marc Wilmots announced that he would call up Kums, along with teammates Matz Sels and Laurent Depoitre, for the international games against Andorra and Israel.

Honours

Club
Gent
Belgian Pro League: 2014–15
Belgian Super Cup : 2015

Anderlecht
Belgian Super Cup : 2017

Individual
UEFA Champions League Team of the Group Stage: 2015
Belgian Golden Shoe: 2015
Honorary Citizen of Dilbeek: 2016

Personal life 
His father Ludo Kums is youth coach at his current club R.S.C. Anderlecht.

Career statistics

Club

References

External links

1988 births
Living people
People from Asse
Association football midfielders
Belgian footballers
R.S.C. Anderlecht players
Lierse S.K. players
K.V. Kortrijk players
SC Heerenveen players
S.V. Zulte Waregem players
K.A.A. Gent players
Belgian Pro League players
Challenger Pro League players
Eredivisie players
Belgian expatriate footballers
Belgian expatriate sportspeople in the Netherlands
Expatriate footballers in the Netherlands
Expatriate footballers in Italy
Udinese Calcio players
Serie A players
Belgian expatriate sportspeople in Italy
Belgium youth international footballers
Belgium under-21 international footballers
Footballers from Flemish Brabant